Stenoma receptella is a moth in the family Depressariidae. It was described by Francis Walker in 1864. It is found in Amazonas, Brazil.

Adults are a pale fawn colour, the forewings rounded at the tips and with the marginal points black and minute. The exterior border is convex, but not oblique. The hindwings are yellowish cinereous.

References

Moths described in 1864
Stenoma